The Vincennes Velvets was the final moniker of the minor league baseball teams based in Vincennes, Indiana between 1903 and 1952. From 1950 to 1952, the Velvets were members of the Class D level Mississippi–Ohio Valley League, which evolved to become today's Midwest League. Previous teams in Vincennes played as members of the Kentucky-Illinois-Tennessee League (1903–1906, 1910–1911, 1913) and Eastern Illinois League (1908).

The 1950 Vincennes Velvets were a minor league affiliate of the St. Louis Browns.

History
The Vincennes Velvets were preceded in Vincennes, Indiana by other minor league teams. In 1903, the Vincennes Alices first played minor league baseball as members of the Kentucky-Illinois-Tennessee League, also known as the KITTY League. Vincennes played in the Kentucky-Illinois-Tennessee League in the 1903–1906, 1910–1911 and 1913 seasons. The team used the Vincennes Reds moniker in 1904 and the Vincennes Hoosiers moniker in 1911. In 1908, the Vincennes Alices played one season as members of the 1908 Eastern Illinois League.

The Vincennes Alices won Kentucky-Illinois-Tennessee League Championships in 1905, 1906 and 1910.

Following the 1949 season, the Belleville Stags of the Mississippi–Ohio Valley League moved to Vincennes following the 1949 season. The franchise became the Vincennes Citizens in 1950, playing as an affiliate of the St. Louis Browns, before operating as an independent in 1951–1952. The team changed from the "Citizens" moniker in 1950 and became the Vincennes Velvets in 1951. The name change occurred when Champagne Velvet Beer became a sponsor of the team.

The 1950 Vincennes Citizens ended the season with a record of 43–76, finishing in seventh place in the eight–team Mississippi–Ohio Valley League regular season under Managers Mel Ivy and Andy Smith. Vincennes was 38.0 games behind the first place Centralia Sterlings in the final regular season standings. Playing at Nehi Park, Vincennes had total home attendance of 18,977, an average of 319 per game.

The Vincennes Velvets finished in sixth place in 1951, ending the season 39.5 games behind the first place Paris Lakers in the regular season standings. With a 43–74 record under Managers Stormy Kromer and Bob Signaigo, Vincennes was last in the six–team Mississippi–Ohio Valley League standings. Vincennes had 1951 total attendance of 25,652, an average of 438 per game, fifth in the league.

The franchise moved during the 1951 season. On June 7, 1952, the Vincennes Velvets moved to Canton, Illinois, where the franchise became the Canton Citizens The Vincennes/Canton team finished the 1952 season with a 54–70 record and placed sixth in the eight–team Mississippi–Ohio Valley League, finishing 31.5 games behind the first place Danville Dans. The Vincennes Velvets were the last minor league team in Vincennes, Indiana.

The ballpark
Beginning in 1950, Vincennes teams were noted to have played home games at Nehi Park. Nehi Park was located at 13th Street & Willow Street, Vincennes, Indiana. The ballpark was located behind the Nehi Bottling Works.

Timeline

Notable alumni

Zinn Beck (1908)
Chet Carmichael (1908)
Jim Duggan (1905)
Charlie French (1905–1906)
Harry Glenn (1911)
Clyde Goodwin (1904)
Roy Hawes (1950)
Ed Hug (1904)
Heinie Jantzen (1911)
Eddie Kolb (1905–1906)
Hub Perdue (1905–1906)
Ollie Pickering (1911, 1913, MGR)

See also
Vincennes Velvets/Canton Citizens playersVincennes Alices playersVincennes Citizens playersVincennes Hoosiers players

References

External links
Vincennes - Baseball Reference

Defunct Midwest League teams
Defunct baseball teams in Indiana
Vincennes, Indiana
1951 establishments in Indiana
1952 disestablishments in Indiana
Baseball teams established in 1951
Baseball teams disestablished in 1952
Mississippi-Ohio Valley League
Defunct minor league baseball teams